Shukrayaan-1 is a planned orbiter to Venus by the Indian Space Research Organisation (ISRO) to study the surface and atmosphere of Venus.

Funds were released in 2017 to complete preliminary studies, and solicitations for instruments have been announced.

Overview 
The three broad research areas of interest for this mission include surface/subsurface stratigraphy and re-surfacing processes; second: study the atmospheric chemistry, dynamics and compositional variations, and third: study of solar irradiance and solar wind interaction with Venus ionosphere while studying the structure, composition and dynamics of the atmosphere.

Status
Based on the success of Chandrayaan and the Mangalyaan, ISRO has been studying the feasibility of future interplanetary missions to Mars and Venus, the closest planetary neighbours to Earth. The mission concept to Venus was first presented at a Tirupati space meet in 2012. The Government of India, in its budget for 2017–18 gave the Department of Space a 23% increase. Under the space sciences section, the budget mentions provisions "for Mars Orbiter Mission II and Mission to Venus", and following the 2017–18 request for grants, it was authorized to complete preliminary studies. From 2016 to 2017, ISRO collaborated with JAXA to study the Venus atmosphere using signals from the Akatsuki in a radio occultation experiment.

On 19 April 2017, ISRO made an 'Announcement of Opportunity' (AO) seeking science payload proposals from Indian academia based on broad mission specifications. On 6 November 2018, ISRO made another 'Announcement of Opportunity' inviting payload proposals from the international scientific community. The available science payload capacity was revised to 100 kg from 175 kg mentioned in the first AO.

The space agencies of India (ISRO) and France (CNES) were holding in 2018  discussions to collaborate on this mission and jointly develop autonomous navigation and aerobraking technologies. In addition, French astrophysicist Jacques Blamont, with his experience from the Vega program, expressed his interest to U R Rao to use inflated balloons to help study the Venusian atmosphere. Just like during the Vega missions, these instrumented balloons could be deployed from an orbiter and take prolonged observations while floating in the relatively mild upper atmosphere of the planet.  ISRO agreed to consider the proposal to use a balloon probe carrying  payload to study the Venusian atmosphere at  altitude.

As of late 2018, the Venus mission is in the configuration study phase and ISRO has not sought the Indian government's full approval. Somak Raychaudhury, the director of IUCAA, stated in 2019 that a drone-like probe was being considered to be a part of mission.

In an update provided to NASA's Decadal Planetary Science Committee, ISRO scientist T Maria Antonita, said that the launch is expected to take place in December 2024. She said that there is also a backup date in 2026. As of November 2020, ISRO has shortlisted 20 international proposals that include collaboration with Russia, France, Sweden and Germany. Swedish Institute of Space Physics is engaged with ISRO for Shukrayaan-1 mission.

In May 2022, ISRO chairman S. Somanath stated that the mission is planned for launch in December 2024, with an alternate launch window in 2031.

Science payload
, 16 Indian and 7 international payloads have been shortlisted. Some of them will be selected.

Indian instruments

 Venus L&S-Band SAR
 VARTISS (HF radar)
 VSEAM (Surface Emissivity)
 VTC (Thermal Camera)
 VCMC (Cloud Monitoring)
 LIVE (Lightning Sensor)
 VASP (Spectro Polarimeter)
 SPAV (Solar occultation photometry)
 NAVA (Airglow imager)
 RAVI (RO Experiment)*
 ETA (Electron Temperature Analyser)
 RPA (Retarding Potential Analyser)
 Mass Spectrometer
 VISWAS (Plasma Analyser)*
 Venus Radiation environment monitor (VeRad)
 Venus Solar Soft x-ray Spectrometer (VS3) 
 VIPER (Plasma Wave Detector)
 VODEX (Dust experiment)
* RAVI and VISWAS are being proposed as collaboration with Germany and Sweden.

International instruments
Terahertz devices to generate powerful radar pulses. Proposed by NASA. 
Two Russian payloads by the Russian Space Research Institute and Moscow Institute of Physics and Technology have been shortlisted, both would study the atmosphere of Venus:

 VIRAL (Venus InfraRed Atmospheric gases Linker) by Space research Institute, Moscow (after their collaboration with LATMOS, France ended)
 IVOLGA: A laser heterodyne NIR spectrometer for studying of structure and dynamics of the Venusian mesosphere.

See also 

 List of missions to Venus
 Observations and explorations of Venus

References

2024 in spaceflight
2024 in India
ISRO space probes
Missions to Venus
Proposed space probes